The  Gosagroprom Building is the headquarters of the Ministry of Land and Property Relations, Republic of Bashkortostan State Committee of placement of orders, Republic of Bashkortostan State Committee of Trade and Consumer Protection.

It is located in the national capital, Ufa.

The building is served by a state enterprise "Management office buildings."

See also
Republic House, Bashkortostan

References

External links
 Interactive tour to President of Bashkortostan

Government of Bashkortostan